Craig Dove (born 6 August 1983) is an English footballer who plays for Alsager Town.

Career
Starting his career with Middlesbrough, Dove joined York City on a months loan in October 2003. followed by a season at Rushden & Diamonds. He then signed for Chester City and during his time with Chester was loaned out to Forest Green Rovers. He was freed by Chester the following summer, playing 8 games for Buxton the following season but left after failing to hold down a regular place.

In July 2008, Dove joined Northern Premier league side Kidsgrove Athletic. He left Kidsgrove in January 2014 to become assistant manager at Alsager Town.

Notes

External links

1983 births
Living people
Footballers from Hartlepool
English footballers
Association football midfielders
Middlesbrough F.C. players
York City F.C. players
Rushden & Diamonds F.C. players
Chester City F.C. players
Forest Green Rovers F.C. players
Kidsgrove Athletic F.C. players
Buxton F.C. players
Alsager Town F.C. players
English Football League players
National League (English football) players
Northern Premier League players